Blaker is a hamlet in the Dutch province of South Holland. It is located in the municipality of Westland (formerly De Lier), about 2 km northeast of the village of De Lier.

The hamlet consists of a single road, stretching between the Leê canal and the Noord Lierweg road.

The area in which the hamlet is located, the "Oude Lierpolder", used to be called "Blaker" as well.

References

Populated places in South Holland
Westland (municipality), Netherlands